Noah Cumberland (born 15 March 2001) is a professional Australian rules footballer playing for the Richmond Football Club in the Australian Football League (AFL).

Early life
Cumberland was raised on the Sunshine Coast, Queensland, where he attended Mountain Creek State High School and played junior football for Maroochydore. He was also a member of the Brisbane Lions Academy and played part in their victorious 2019 NEAFL Grand Final team where he kicked two goals. The Lions would eventually choose to pass on their opportunity to draft Cumberland when Richmond placed a bid on him.

AFL career
Cumberland was drafted by Richmond with the 43rd overall pick in the 2019 AFL Draft. He was delisted at the end of the 2021 season without having played a match at AFL level, but was re-drafted as a rookie by Richmond before the 2022 season.

Statistics
Updated to the end of round 23, 2022.

|-
| 2020
| 
| 38 || 0 || – || – || – || – || – || – || – || – || – || – || – || – || – || –
|-
| 2021
| 
| 38 || 0 || – || – || – || – || – || – || – || – || – || – || – || – || – || –
|- 
| 2022
|  || 38 || 8 || 18 || 13 || 52 || 26 || 78 || 16 || 17 || 2.3 || 1.6 || 6.5 || 3.3 || 9.8 || 2.0 || 2.1
|- class="sortbottom" 
! colspan=3| Career
! 8
! 18
! 13
! 52
! 26
! 78
! 16
! 17
! 2.3
! 1.6
! 6.5
! 3.3
! 9.8
! 2.0
! 2.1
|}

References

External links

Noah Cumberland's profile at Rookie Me Central

Living people
2001 births
Richmond Football Club players
Sportspeople from the Sunshine Coast
Australian rules footballers from Queensland